Jawbreaker is a 1999 American teen black comedy crime film directed and written by Darren Stein.  The film stars Rose McGowan, Rebecca Gayheart, and Julie Benz as girls in an exclusive clique in their high school. Charlotte Ayanna has a non-speaking cameo role as the murdered fourth member of the group. The film was inspired by the 1988 film Heathers, and is often compared to it, particularly the plot involving a popular female clique, the use of bright pastels, and the ostensibly accidental killing of one of its members.

Of his concept for the film, Stein has stated, "The jawbreaker just came to represent the duality of the poppy sweetness of the girls, of high school and of youth, versus the whole idea that this thing could break your jaw". The film was released on February 19, 1999, and was a critical and financial failure, although it has come to gain a cult following. Similarities have been drawn between Jawbreaker, Heathers and the 2004 film Mean Girls.

Plot

On the morning of her 17th birthday, popular high-school senior Liz Purr is kidnapped in her bed by three masked assailants, one of whom stuffs a jawbreaker into her mouth as a gag before she is placed in the trunk of a car. The kidnappers turn out to be Liz's three best friends Courtney, Marcie, and Julie, who are playing a cruel prank on her for her birthday. When the girls drive up to a diner to treat Liz to breakfast, they pop the trunk and discover that Liz is dead, having choked to death on the jawbreaker lodged in her throat.

Julie wants to go to the police, but Courtney forbids her. Courtney calls the school pretending to be Liz's mother and tells them Liz is ill and cannot attend school, then the three go to school as though nothing had happened. When school outcast and ardent admirer of Liz, Fern Mayo, is sent by Principal Sherwood to deliver Liz's homework at the end of the day, she stumbles upon the three girls at Liz's house trying to arrange her body in bed. Courtney tries to fabricate a story that Liz died at the hands of a rapist.
 
Fern attempts to flee the house, but the girls catch her and Courtney buys her silence by accepting her into the clique, telling her to take Liz's place, despite Julie's protests. Courtney and Marcie give Fern a makeover, transforming her from plain and awkward to elegant and beautiful. The transformation is so complete, Courtney introduces Fern as the beautiful exchange student "Vylette".

Julie, overwhelmed by guilt at her part in Liz's death, breaks away from the clique, only to be tormented by her former friends, and as her popularity dissolves, she becomes a new target for abuse and contempt throughout the school. Her only real friend during this time is her boyfriend, a drama student named Zack. As Vylette's popularity soars, Julie watches in silence as Courtney spins an endless web of lies to cover up the murder and maintain her popularity. Julie threatens to go to the police and tell them the truth, but Courtney retorts that she, Marcie, and now Vylette will claim Julie killed Liz if she attempts to expose them. To her disgust, Julie learns that, after they had returned Liz's corpse to her house, Courtney went out that same night and seduced a stranger  at a sleazy bar and had sex with him in Liz's bed, making it seem as though he had raped Liz.

Vylette becomes intoxicated with her new-found popularity, which has eclipsed Courtney's own. Courtney orders Vylette to learn her place, but Vylette vows that if Courtney does not watch her step, then she will reveal the truth behind Liz's death. In response, Courtney and Marcie post enlarged yearbook photos of Fern Mayo all over the school with the message "Who is Vylette" written on them, revealing Vylette's true identity and leaving her humiliated by the entire school. Julie takes pity on Fern and forgives her for being corrupted by Courtney.

Feeling no remorse for the lives she has destroyed, the heartless Courtney attends the senior prom with jock Dane Sanders. Meanwhile, Julie is at home going through a bag of Liz's belongings that were given to her. Upon finding a recordable greeting card she was fiddling with when Courtney was faking Liz's death scene, Julie discovers it has recorded Courtney's admission to the killing. Armed with this evidence, Julie, Fern and Zack hurry to the prom.

When Dane and Courtney are announced as Prom King and Queen, Zack sneaks backstage and broadcasts the card's message over the sound system. Disgusted, Dane quickly abandons Courtney while Marcie hides under a table. Horrified that her scheme has unraveled, Courtney tearfully races for the exit as the rest of the furious students pelt her with corsages and call her a murderer. Julie snaps a picture of her former friend's anguished face to immortalize the occasion.

Cast

Production
Director Darren Stein brought his script to executives at Columbia Tri-Star, who agreed to finance the film if he could cast either Natalie Portman, Kate Winslet or Rose McGowan.
The role of Julie originally went to Rachael Leigh Cook, who was eventually replaced with Rebecca Gayheart because the producers felt she did not have the right chemistry with the two other actresses. Gayheart had auditioned for the roles of Fern and Marcie before she was selected for Julie. Marilyn Manson, who was then dating McGowan, agreed to appear in a non-speaking cameo role.

On a small budget of $3.5 million, Jawbreaker was filmed at locations in and around the Los Angeles area. 'Reagan High School' was actually University High School in West Los Angeles, with the cafeteria scenes filmed at Notre Dame High School in Sherman Oaks. The diner that the girls drive up to at the beginning of the film is Johnie's Broiler in Downey, California, the filming site for many film and television productions. McGowan based her performance on that of Gene Tierney's sociopathic character in Leave Her to Heaven (1945).

The distinctive costumes were designed by Vikki Barrett, who drew on 1980s and 1950s-era fashion trends blended with fetishistic elements like lycra skirts, all in bright, candy-like colors to evoke the jawbreaker.

Before the film could be released, the MPAA objected to a graphic sex-scene between McGowan's and Marilyn Manson's characters, which had to be cut down to give the film an R rating instead of an NC-17. To accompany the release of the film, Imperial Teen's music video for the song "Yoo Hoo" featured McGowan as Courtney Shayne harassing the band members with jawbreakers.

Reception
Critical response at the time of release  was overwhelmingly negative. Many critics pointed out the film's similarities to the 1988 cult-classic Heathers and accused Jawbreaker of plagiarism. On Metacritic the film has a score of 22% based on reviews from 21 critics, indicating "generally unfavorable reviews". On Rotten Tomatoes it has an approval rating of 14% based on 64 reviews, with an average of 3.6 out of 10. The website's consensus states: "This throwaway comedy falls victim to its hip sensibilities." Audiences surveyed by CinemaScore gave Jawbreaker a grade D+

Roger Ebert gave the film one and a half out of four, stating "The movie is a slick production of a lame script ... If anyone in the plot had the slightest intelligence, the story would implode". Francesca Dinglasan from Boxoffice magazine gave the film one and a half out of five, criticizing the film's humor and similarities to Heathers.

James Berardinelli gave the film a more favorable two and a half out of four, calling it "palatable, and occasionally even clever", but concluding, "while the film offers more than a Heathers rehash, it never fully develops its own identity.

McGowan was nominated for the MTV Movie Award for Best Villain, but lost to Matt Dillon for his role as Pat Healy There's Something About Mary.

Legacy
Despite the negative critical feedback, Jawbreaker found success through home video release and subsequent television airings; it has developed a cult following. Vice magazine called the film a "teen classic" when it published a retrospective in 2016 titled "Perverting the Youth of America: The Oral History of Teen Classic Jawbreaker". Dazed magazine published a similar feature, crediting the film with inspiring 2004's Mean Girls, and praising the dark tones and performances.

McGowan's Courtney Shayne has become something of a pop culture icon on social media, with TribecaFilm.com declaring of McGowan's performance that "...every single line-reading was a thing of Bette Davis-aspiring beauty, and with any justice, it's a performance that will only grow in esteem over time."

Jawbreaker's costumes have also been celebrated, drawing praise from the likes of Vogue and Rookie magazines. The scene where the actresses strut down the hallway in slow-motion to Imperial Teen's "Yoo Hoo" has become a signature feature of the film, drawing homage in film and television, most notably Mean Girls, and being parodied in films like Not Another Teen Movie (2001).

In 2014, Judy Greer said in an interview: "I really didn't think it was anything special while we were shooting it, but when I saw the final product, I knew it was really good. I was so proud of it. I thought it looked beautiful. It had just the right amount of sexy, pop culture fun to it. I do think it's quite special."

Soundtrack
 "Yoo Hoo" (Imperial Teen) – 3:31
 "I See" (Letters To Cleo) – 3:56
 "Next to You" (Ednaswap) – 2:35
 "Don't Call Me Babe" (Shampoo) – 2:58
 "Bad Word for a Good Thing" (Friggs) – 2:53
 "Stay in Bed" (Grand Mal) – 4:49
 "Flow" (Transister) – 5:59
 "She Bop" (Howie Beno) – 3:06
 "Water Boy" (Imperial Teen) – 1:36
 "Rock You Like a Hurricane" (Scorpions) – 4:14
 "Rock 'n' Roll Machine" (The Donnas) – 2:54
 "Beat You Up" (The Prissteens) – 2:36
 "Trouble" (Shampoo) – 3:21

 Songs not included on the soundtrack 
 The Cars, "Good Times Roll" 
 Connie Francis, "Lollipop Lips"
 The Friggs, "Heartbreaker"
 Veruca Salt, "Volcano Girls" (opening scene)

Connie Francis did not approve the use of her song "Lollipop Lips" in this film, which was used without her permission and was heard during a sex scene. Francis filed two lawsuits over the unauthorized use of her song in Jawbreaker. In 2002, Francis sued her record company Universal Music Group (UMG) for allowing several of her songs to be synchronized to "sexually themed" movies. Jawbreaker was specifically mentioned by name in the lawsuit. Francis was unsuccessful and the judge threw the case out of court. The second lawsuit involved Francis suing the producers of Jawbreaker for the unauthorized use of "Lollipop Lips" in the film.

Musical adaptation

In 2013, a musical adaptation of Jawbreaker was made starring Elizabeth Gillies as Courtney Shayne and had public readings, but failed to make it to major production or have a publicized stage run despite Stein's efforts.

Television series
It was announced in February 2017 that the film would be reimagined as a television series for E! Darren Stein, the writer and director of the original film, was said to write and produce the series, but no further developments were made.

References

External links
 
 
 
 Official site for Jawbreaker: The Musical
 Jawbreaker profile, screenit.com; accessed May 21, 2017.

1999 films
1999 comedy films
1990s black comedy films
1990s crime comedy films
1990s high school films
1990s satirical films
1990s teen comedy films
American black comedy films
American crime comedy films
American high school films
American satirical films
American teen comedy films
Films about pranks
Films about proms
Films directed by Darren Stein
1999 independent films
Films shot in Los Angeles
Teen crime films
TriStar Pictures films
1990s English-language films
1990s American films